Hyperolius hutsebauti is a species of frog in the family Hyperoliidae. It is found widely in the eastern Democratic Republic of the Congo and has recently (2016) been recorded in Burundi. The specific name hutsebauti honours Franz Joseph Hutsebaut (1886–1954), a Catholic missionary in what was then Belgian Congo. Common names Ibembo reed frog and Hutsebaut's reed frog have been coined for it.

Taxonomy and systematics
Hyperolius hutsebauti was first described as a subspecies of Hyperolius tuberculatus. It is now recognized as a distinct species within the so-called Hyperolius tuberculatus complex, which includes Hyperolius dintelmanni as the third species.

Description
Hyperolius hutsebauti is similar to Hyperolius tuberculatus but phase F ("female phase") has diffuse darker marbling on a light ground colour. The pupil is horizontal.

Habitat and conservation
It is a widespread and locally abundant species that is unlikely to be facing significant threats.

References

hutsebauti
Frogs of Africa
Amphibians of Burundi
Amphibians of the Democratic Republic of the Congo
Amphibians described in 1956
Taxa named by Raymond Laurent
Taxonomy articles created by Polbot